
Gmina Borki is a rural gmina (administrative district) in Radzyń Podlaski County, Lublin Voivodeship, in eastern Poland.

Villages
Gmina Borki contains the villages and settlements of Borki, Krasew, Maruszewiec, Nowiny, Olszewnica, Osowno, Pasmugi, Sitno, Stara Wieś, Tchórzew, Tchórzew-Kolonia, Wola Chomejowa, Wola Osowińska, Wola Osowińska-Kolonia and Wrzosów.

Neighbouring gminas
Gmina Borki is bordered by the gminas of Czemierniki, Kock, Radzyń Podlaski, Ulan-Majorat and Wojcieszków.

References
Polish official population figures 2006

Borki
Radzyń Podlaski County